The Mexican Secretariat of National Defense (SEDENA);  is the government department responsible for managing Mexico's Army and Air Forces. Its head is the Secretary of National Defense who, like the co-equal Secretary of the Navy, is directly answerable to the President. Before 1937, the position was called the Secretary of War and Navy (Secretaría de Guerra y Marina). The agency has its headquarters in Lomas de Sotelo, Miguel Hidalgo, Mexico City. Some key figures who answer directly to the Secretary are the Assistant Secretary, the Chief of Staff of the Armed Forces, and all military tribunals.

Role
Under the Federal Public Administration Act (Ley Orgánica de la Administración Pública Federal), the Secretary has the following duties:

 Organize and administer affairs of the Army, Air Force and the National Guard and assist in its functions.
 Organize and assist in development and enforcement of National Military Service for the Army and Air Force.
 Management of the Army, Air Force, National Guard and armed contingents which don't belong to state's national guard or law enforcement agencies.
 Plan, direct and handle mobilization of the country in the event of war; formulating and executing, in due case, plans and orders necessary for national defense purposes, as well as directing and advising civil defense.
 Construct and prepare every kind of military buildings for Army and Air Force use, including forts and barracks, as well as administration of barracks, hospitals and other military buildings.
 Administer military justice.
 Acquire and build armaments, ammunition, and all kinds of materials and elements for the use of Army and Air Force.
 Grant permission for an expedition force to enter another country or to allow another country to send their forces to Mexico.
 Manage the issuing of licenses to bear firearms with the aim of preventing the use of arms expressly banned in law and also those types of arms restricted by the state for the exclusive use of the Army, Navy and National Guard, with the exception of what is established by the 13th section of Article 30 of the Constitution, as well as the supervision and issuing of permits for the sale, transport and storage of firearms, chemical weapons, explosives and strategic weapons.

List of secretaries

See also 
Museo del Enervante - a Sedena museum dedicated to those who have fought drug trafficking in Mexico.
 Zuyaqui - a famous dog who worked for the agency.

Sources

External links 
Official site of the Secretariat of National Defense 
Official site of the Secretariat of National Defense, English version
Citizens' Portal, Official Site of the Mexican Government 
Basic Law of Federal Public Administration 

Politics of Mexico
National Defense
Military of Mexico
Mexico
National Defense